Lady Stanhope may refer to:

The wives of the Earls Stanhope.
The wives of the eldest sons of the Earls of Chesterfield.
Katherine Stanhope, Countess of Chesterfield (known as Lady Stanhope from her marriage to Henry Stanhope, Lord Stanhope).
Lady Hester Stanhope